Table Tennis was contested by men and women at the 2006 Asian Games in Doha, Qatar from November 29 to December 7.  It was one of six sports to begin prior to the Opening Ceremonies on December 1.  Singles, Doubles, and Team events were held with all competition taking place at the Al-Arabi Indoor Hall.

Schedule

Medalists

Medal table

Participating nations
A total of 144 athletes from 22 nations competed in table tennis at the 2006 Asian Games:

References

External links

 Results

 
2006
Asian Games
2006 Asian Games events